Martin Moana (born 13 August 1973) is a New Zealand former professional rugby league footballer who was an international representative and played club football in England and New Zealand.

Early years
Moana started his senior career in 1989, playing for Waikato in New Zealand domestic competitions. He made the Northern Zone U13's team in 1986, the New Zealand U15's Schoolboy Kiwis in 1988 and the New Zealand U17's in 1989. He was a Junior Kiwi in 1992, being part of a successful team who defeated the Junior Kangaroos. In 1993 Moana signed with Auckland Warriors, and toured Australia with their development side.

Waikato and Auckland
In the 1994 Lion Red Cup Moana scored 14 tries in 22 games for the Waikato Cougars. He was then selected for the New Zealand Residents' tour of Australia and named in the New Zealand Māori side for the 1994 Pacific Cup in Fiji.

In 1995 he played for the Auckland Warriors, and was in the inaugural side. He also represented New Zealand in the 1995 World Sevens.

England
Moana was not retained by the Warriors at the end of the year and in 1996 he joined Halifax Blue Sox in the Super League competition. He played there for five years and became a legend around Halifax. Moana competed for the Aotearoa Māori at the 2000 Rugby League World Cup.

At the end of 2000 Moana left Halifax, and became something of a rugby league nomad. He spent 2001 at both the Huddersfield Giants and Doncaster, 2002 at the Wakefield Trinity Wildcats, returned briefly to Halifax for the start of 2003 before finishing the season with the Salford City Reds. In 2005 he moved again re-joining Doncaster before seemingly settling at Swinton Lions where he was player of the year in 2006. He remained with the Swinton Lions until his retirement at the end of the 2009 season.

Later life - BBEC

Martin now works at BBEC school where he is pastoral manager. He is a much loved member of the school who is appreciated by all staff and pupils. One staff member was quoted as saying 'Martin is a top guy' and has helped alfie wood out

References

1973 births
Living people
Doncaster R.L.F.C. players
Halifax R.L.F.C. players
Huddersfield Giants players
Huntly United players
Junior Kiwis players
New Zealand Māori rugby league players
New Zealand Māori rugby league team players
New Zealand rugby league players
New Zealand Warriors players
Rugby league five-eighths
Rugby league locks
Rugby league players from Huntly, New Zealand
Salford Red Devils players
Swinton Lions players
Waikato rugby league team players
Wakefield Trinity players
New Zealand expatriate sportspeople in England